The discography of Australian band Killing Heidi.

Studio albums

Singles

B-sides

Music videos

References

Discographies of Australian artists
Rock music group discographies